Dan Richardson (born 25 March 1996) is an English rugby union player who plays for Leicester Tigers in Premiership Rugby.

The loosehead prop played junior rugby with his home-town club at Penrith in Cumbria before representing Leeds Beckett University, where he studied Sports and Exercise Science. Ahead of the 2017/18 season, he joined National One side Fylde and then spent a season with Rotherham Titans in National League 1.

On 19 March 2019, Richardson moved to the RFU Championship with Jersey Reds ahead of the 2019–20 season. On 9 July 2021, Richardson makes his move to Premiership Rugby with Leicester Tigers ahead of the 2021–22 season.

Richardson made his Leicester debut on 13 November 2021 as a second half substitute in a Premiership Rugby Cup win against Sale Sharks at Welford Road.

References

External links
Leicester Tigers Profile
Its Rugby Profile

1996 births
Living people
English rugby union players
Leicester Tigers players
Jersey Reds players
Rotherham Titans players
Rugby union props
Rugby union players from Penrith, Cumbria